Alberto Andrés Alvarado Arámburo (4 February 1925 – 14 February 1996) was a Mexican politician who served as the Governor of Baja California Sur from 1981 to 1987. A member of the Institutional Revolutionary Party (PRI), he succeeded his cousin, Angel César Mendoza Arámburo, as governor. He also served as a Senator and a federal deputy. He was shot and killed in Mexico City in 1996 during an attempted robbery.

There is a locality in Mulegé Municipality named after him.

References

1925 births
1996 deaths
Institutional Revolutionary Party politicians
Governors of Baja California Sur
Members of the Senate of the Republic (Mexico)
Members of the Chamber of Deputies (Mexico)
20th-century Mexican politicians
Deaths by firearm in Mexico
Politicians from Baja California Sur
People from La Paz, Baja California Sur